Jacqueline Padovani Grima is a Maltese judge in the family court.

See also 
Judiciary of Malta

References 

Living people
21st-century Maltese judges
Maltese women
Year of birth missing (living people)
21st-century women judges